Rosebud is a 2019 South Korean comedy film directed by Jo Seok-hyun. It was released on January 16, 2019.

Plot
Set between the late 1970s and present day, the story follows a woman named Hong Jang-mi who dreams to become a singer.

Cast

Production 
Principal photography began on January 29, 2016, and wrapped on April 30, 2016.

References

External links

 

2019 films
2019 comedy films
South Korean comedy films
2010s South Korean films
2010s Korean-language films